Signija Šenberga (born 13 March 2003) is a Latvian footballer who plays as a midfielder for Liepājas and the Latvia national team.

International career
Šenberga made her debut for the Latvia national team on 27 October 2020, coming on as a substitute for Ksenija Nagle against Slovakia.

References

2003 births
Living people
Women's association football midfielders
Latvian women's footballers
Latvia women's international footballers